CHEP (Commonwealth Handling Equipment Pool) is a company dealing in pallet and container pooling services, serving customers in a range of industrial and retail supply chains. It is a subsidiary of Brambles.

CHEP offers wooden and plastic pallets, small display pallets, crates and IBC containers. These products can generally be recognised by their blue color and CHEP logo.

History 

CHEP evolved from the Allied Materials Handling Standing Committee, an organisation developed by the Australian government to provide efficient handling of defence supplies during World War II.

When the war ended in 1945, the United States Army returned home, leaving behind millions of blue pallets at their military bases in Australia. With this asset base and established infrastructure, the Australian Government continued to endorse the organisation after the war to support the national economy. In 1958, CHEP was sold to Brambles.

CHEP has operations in 45 countries, employs approximately 7,500 people and has a pool of approximately 300 million blue US navy pallets and containers.

In 2014, Radio National reported that CHEP's dominance of pallet hire and supply had become a challenge to "pallet recyclers in America, where approximately twelve to fifteen percent of all lumber produced is used in its own pallet manufacturing."

References

External links 
The Blue Pallet, a 2014 radio show by NPR's Planet Money about CHEP and their blue pallets.

Companies based in Sydney
1946 establishments in Australia